Salina Hayat Ivy (born 5 June 1966) is a Bangladeshi politician, physician, and the first and incumbent mayor of Narayanganj City Corporation. Ivy has been given the status of State Minister on 8 August 2022 along with the Mayor of Chattragram. She won third time as the Mayor in the Narayanganj City Corporation election in 2022.

Early life and education 
Selina Hayat Ivy was born on 6 June 1966 in a political family of Narayanganj District. Her father was former Narayanganj municipal chairman Ali Ahmed Chunka  and her mother was Momtaz Begum. Ivy is the first child among the five children. She started her education from Deovogh Akhra Primary School. Later om, she was admitted to Narayanganj Preparatory School and she studied up to the sixth grade. Then she was admitted to Morgan Girls' High School. She got junior scholarship in 1979 and passed her secondary school certificate examination in 1982. Then she joined the Odessa National Medical University in 1985 for a scholarship to the Russian government and took medical degree with merit in 1992. Later, in 1992-93, she completed her intern at Mitford Hospital. Ivy worked as an Honorary doctor in Midwest Hospital in 1993-94 after her long education, and in Narayanganj 200-bed hospital for 1994–95. Previously, she had also run the municipality for eight years from 2003. She is affiliated with the Awami League.

Career 
In 1993, Ivy was the health and environmental affairs officer of Narayanganj City Awami League. Her active political career began in 2003 by participating in the municipal chairman election. In 2003, she was elected the Chairperson of Narayanganj Municipality and elected the first female chairperson of Narayanganj Municipality. Presently, she is the vice-president of Narayanganj City Awami League. She is the founder president of Ali Ahmad Chunka Foundation and Narayanganj Heart Foundation. She is also in charge of the convening of Narayanganj district of Swadhinata Chikitsak Parishad.

Personal life 
Ivy married to Kazi Ahsan Hayat from New Zealand. They have two sons named Shadman Kazi and Sharjil Kazi.

Awards
 Anannya Top Ten Awards (2015)

References

1966 births
Living people
People from Narayanganj District
Odesa National Medical University alumni
Awami League politicians
Mayors of Narayanganj
Women mayors of places in Bangladesh